Fasolt, Fasold or Vasolt is a giant who appears in the following works:

The Middle High German heroic poem Eckenlied (c. 1230).

The Old Norse compendium of German legends known as the Thidrekssaga (c. 1250).

Richard Wagner's opera Das Rheingold (1869).

The name Fasolt likely derives from a root similar to Old High German faso, thread, and most likely refers to the long braided hair he is described as having in the Eckenlied. He may have originally been a storm demon, as evidenced by  a 17th-century prayer to witches at the mountain Jochgrimm outside of Bozen to cause "ffasolt" to send storms far away.

Notes

References

Giants
German heroic legends
Germanic mythology